The 1935–36 Hong Kong First Division League season was the 28th since its establishment.

League table

References
1935–36 Hong Kong First Division table (RSSSF)
香港倒後鏡blog

Hong Kong
First
Hong Kong First Division League seasons